John Isner and Jack Sock were the defending champions but withdrew from their first round match.

Henri Kontinen and John Peers won the title, defeating Łukasz Kubot and Marcelo Melo in the final, 6–4, 6–2.

Seeds
All seeds received a bye into the second round.

Draw

Finals

Top half

Bottom half

References
 Main Draw

Doubles